Pilni village is located in pundri Tehsil of Kaithal district in Haryana, India. As per 2009 stats, Pilni village is also a gram panchayat.

Demographics
Most of the population of the village are Indian and widely spoken languages are Hindi and Haryanavi.

Schools
 Govt. Sr. Secondary Sechool.

Transportation
The nearby Railway stations to Pilni village are New Kaithal Halt Railway station (NKLE) and Kaithal Railway station (KLE).

From Kaithal bus stand, bus services are also available to Delhi, Hisar, Chandigarh, Jammu and many other places.

References 

Villages in Kaithal district